Meta-systems have several definitions. In general, they link the concepts "system" and "meta-". A "meta-system" is about other systems, such as describing, generalizing, modelling, or analyzing the other system(s).

According to Turchin and Joslyn (1997), this "natural" systemic definition is not sufficient for their Theory of Meta-system Transition, it also is not equivalent to the definition of system of systems in Autopoietic Systems Theory.

In economics 
In economics, meta-systems are like what Bataille calls general economies as opposed to the restricted economies of systems.

In mathematics, biology and psychology

In mathematics, biology and psychology, many variables have occurred within structures and systems that determined the results, discoveries, rates and value(s) of sets, systems, and developments within systems, structures, systems within structures and sets of structures.

A mathematical-modelling rule system for a domain D is an example of a meta-system in mathematics and science, for similar and consistency of concrete or frequency found in models within a domain. 
These are all modes or models; where commonalities are more consistent with consecutive scores or values within a ranged order and are good indicators for gauging probabilities, traits (psychology) or properties (biology).

In cultural studies and sociology 
Meta-systems in cultural studies and sociology refer to contexts, milieu, situations, ecosystems, environments and the biological process with the use of commonalities in behavioral traits and human developments found surrounding a social or scientific system which the system must interact with in order to remain viable. Meta-systems have different structures and also are complementary to other structures of such systems. Without this complementarity in the values, bondings, or tact, the systems could not remain productive, viable or operational.

In cybernetics
The term "meta-system" (or "metasystem") in cybernetics is synonymous with management system or control system. Stafford Beer, who founded management cybernetics with his viable system model, speaks of metasystems that apply metalanguages which are able to find means of making decisions when necessary improvements cannot be made. Here metalanguage works in a larger context than the language it describes and has more variety, namely the number of possible control states of a given system.

See also
 Abstraction
 Generalization
 Meta-knowledge
 Metamodeling
 Metasystem transition
 Metatheory
 Specialization (logic)

References 

Systems theory
Conceptual systems